The Georgetown Hoyas men's lacrosse team represents Georgetown University in National Collegiate Athletic Association (NCAA) Division I college lacrosse. The coach is currently Kevin Warne, who is in his eighth season at that position. The team plays its home games at Cooper Field. Georgetown previously competed in the old Big East Conference.  The new Big East sponsors lacrosse. From 2000–2010, they were a member of the ECAC Lacrosse League and before that, they competed as independents.

The Hoyas appeared in their first NCAA tournament in 1997, losing 14–10 to Maryland. Georgetown scored its first tournament victory in 1998, defeating UMBC, 9–8. The only time they ever advanced past the quarterfinals of the tournament came in 1999 as they defeated Notre Dame and Duke before losing to Syracuse in the semifinals. From 1997–2007, they made the tournament every season and from 2002–2007, they made the quarterfinals every season. They failed to return to the tournament until the Hoyas won the Big East Tournament in 2018.

Season results
The following is a list of Georgetown's results by season as an NCAA Division I program:

{| class="wikitable"

|- align="center"

†NCAA canceled 2020 collegiate activities due to the COVID-19 virus.

See also
Georgetown Hoyas women's lacrosse

References

External links
 Official website

NCAA Division I men's lacrosse teams
Georgetown Hoyas men's lacrosse
1951 establishments in Washington, D.C.
Lacrosse clubs established in 1951